Florida Department of Financial Services (FLDFS) is a state agency of Florida. Its headquarters are in Tallahassee. In 2002 the Florida Legislature merged the Department of Insurance, Treasury and State Fire Marshal and the Department of Banking and Finance into one department, the Florida Department of Financial Services.

Organization
The Department is led by the Chief Financial Officer of Florida (CFO), who is elected statewide to a four-year term. The CFO is assisted in running the Department by two Deputy Chief Financial Officers and a Chief of Staff. The Department is made up of 14 functional Divisions, which perform the work of the Department, and 7 Offices, which assist the CFO in managing the Department and fulfilling the CFO's responsibilities.

Chief Financial Officer
Accounting and Auditing Division
Administration Division
Consumer Services Division
Funeral, Cemetery, & Consumer Services Division
Information Systems Division
Insurance Agent and Agency Services Division
Insurance Fraud Division
Legal Services Division
Rehabilitation and Liquidation Division
Risk Management Division
Treasury Division
State Fire Marshal Division
Workers' Compensation Division
Cabinet Affairs Office
Chief of Staff Office
External Affairs Office
Inspector General Office
Insurance Consumer Advocate Office
Legislative Affairs Office
Strategic Planning Office
Public Assistance Fraud

References

External links

 Florida Department of Financial Services

Financial Services
2002 establishments in Florida
Florida